Rocky's Boots is an educational logic puzzle game by Warren Robinett and Leslie Grimm, published by The Learning Company in 1982. It was released for the Apple II, CoCo, Commodore 64, IBM PC and the IBM PCjr. It was followed by a more difficult sequel, Robot Odyssey.  It won Software of the Year awards from Learning Magazine (1983), Parent's Choice magazine (1983), and Infoworld (1982, runner-up), and received the Gold Award (for selling 100,000 copies) from the Software Publishers Association. It was one of the first educational software products for personal computers to successfully use an interactive graphical simulation as a learning environment.

Gameplay

The object of the beginning part of Rocky's Boots is to use a mechanical boot to kick a series of objects (purple or green squares, diamonds, circles, or crosses) off a conveyor belt; each object will score some number of points, possibly negative. To ensure that the boot only kicks the positive objects, the player must connect a series of logic gates to the boot.

The player is represented by an orange square, and picks up devices (the boot, logic gates, clackers, etc.) by moving their square over them and hitting the joystick button. When the boot has kicked all of the positive objects and none of the negative objects (obtaining a score of 24 points), Rocky (a raccoon) will appear and do a beeping dance.

Later, the player finds that he can use all of the game's objects, including AND gates, OR gates, NOT gates, and flip-flops, in an open-ended area to design his own logic circuits and "games". The colors of orange and white were used to show the binary logic states of 1 and 0. As the circuits operated, the signals could be seen slowly propagating through the circuits, as if the electricity was liquid orange fire flowing through transparent pipes.

Reception
II Computing listed Rocky's Boots ninth on the magazine's list of top Apple II education software as of late 1985, based on sales and market-share data. Commodore Microcomputers stated that it "is intuitive and easy for kids of all ages to understand". The magazine approved of the game's lack of "nerve-wracking time limits or invading aliens" and encouragement of "exploratory learning" while teaching "nothing less than the fundamentals of digital computer logic from the ground up". Computer Gaming World called Rocky's Boots "outstanding". The review complimented the game's appeal to both children and adults, and its ability to teach Boolean functions in a non-threatening way. InfoWorld commented positively on the game combining play with educational value and conveying circuit design and Boolean logic to children.

Similar games
The engine for the game was used in several other games by The Learning Company, including the sequel Robot Odyssey, and a later game called Gertrude's Secrets. The distinctive style of the game was modeled after Robinett's earlier Atari 2600 game Adventure, to which Rocky's Boots was originally going to be a sequel.

References

External links
 Rocky's Boots page by co-author
 Play Rocky's Boots on the Internet Archive

1982 video games
Apple II games
Commodore 64 games
DOS games
Programming games
TRS-80 Color Computer games
The Learning Company games
Video games about raccoons
Video games developed in the United States